Coelogyne xyrekes is a species of orchid.

xyrekes